The 2017–18 season was Al-Shorta's 44th season in the Iraqi Premier League, having featured in all 43 previous editions of the competition. They entered this season having finished a promising third in the league in the 2016–17 season, but this season they only managed a fourth place finish, ending up five points off of champions Al-Zawraa after conceding last-minute goals in multiple matches.

Squad

Out on loan

Departed during season

Personnel

Technical Staff

Management

Kit
Supplier: Nike

Transfers

In

Out

Competitions

Iraqi Premier League

References

External links
Al-Shorta website
Al-Shorta TV
Team info at goalzz.com

Al-Shorta SC seasons
Al Shorta